Oh! Susanna is a 1951 American Western film directed by Joseph Kane and written by Charles Marquis Warren. The film stars Rod Cameron, Lorna Gray, Forrest Tucker, Chill Wills, William Ching, Jim Davis, and Wally Cassell. The film was released on March 3, 1951, by Republic Pictures.

Plot
Cavalry officers clash over a saloon singer and an Indian treaty in the gold-rush Dakota.

Cast
Rod Cameron as Captain Webb Calhoun
Lorna Gray as Lia Wilson 
Forrest Tucker as Lieutenant Colonel Unger
Chill Wills as Sergeant Barhydt
William Ching as Corporal Donlin
Jim Davis as Ira Jordan
Wally Cassell as Trooper Muro
Jimmy Lydon as Trumpeter Benton 
Douglas Kennedy as Trooper Emers
William Haade as Trooper Riorty
John Compton as Lieutenant Cutter
James Flavin as Captain Worth
Charles Stevens as Charlie Grass
Al Bridge as Jake Ledbetter 
Marion Randolph as Mrs. Worth
Marshall Reed as Trooper Murray
John Pickard as Rennie
Ruth Brennan as Young wife
Louise Kane as Mary Bannon

Production
Parts of the film were shot in Aspen Mirror Lake and Strawberry Valley in Utah.

References

External links 
 
 

1951 films
American Western (genre) films
1951 Western (genre) films
Republic Pictures films
Films directed by Joseph Kane
Films shot in Utah
Trucolor films
Western (genre) cavalry films
1950s English-language films
1950s American films